Niger has 11 official languages, with French being the official language and Hausa the most spoken language. Depending on how they are counted, Niger has between 8 and 20 indigenous languages, belonging to the Afroasiatic, Nilo-Saharan and Niger–Congo families. The discrepancy comes from the fact that several are closely related, and can be grouped together or considered apart.

Official Languages 
French, inherited from the colonial period, is the official language. It is spoken mainly as a second language by people who have received an education (20% of Nigeriens are literate in French, and even 47% in cities, growing quickly as literacy improves). Although educated Nigeriens still constitute a relatively small percentage of the population, the French language is the language used by the official administration (courts, government, etc.), the media and the business community. See also: African French

Niger has ten official national languages, namely Arabic, Buduma, Fulfulde, Gourmanchéma, Hausa, Kanuri, Zarma & Songhai, Tamasheq, Tassawaq, Tebu. These ten national languages, their language families, the approximate percentage of the population that speak them, their approximate home regions, and additional information are as follows:

Languages by number of speakers (according to Ethnologue)

By Region

Dominant languages

See also 
 Demographics of Niger

References

External links 
 Ethnologue report on "Languages of Niger"
 PanAfriL10n page on Niger
 Linguistic situation in Niger